Piero Betello (born January 11, 1935 in Rome) is a retired Italian professional football player. 

He played for 4 seasons (29 games, 1 goal) in the Serie A for A.S. Roma, U.S. Città di Palermo and S.S.C. Napoli.

See also
List of football clubs in Italy

References

External links
Profile at Carrierecalciatori.it

1935 births
Living people
Italian footballers
Serie A players
A.S. Roma players
Palermo F.C. players
S.S.C. Napoli players
Brescia Calcio players
Empoli F.C. players
Association football midfielders